Harmel is a surname. Notable people with the surname include:

Heinz Harmel
Kristin Harmel, American novelist
Lilian Harmel, Austrian dancer, choreographer, and pedagogue
Pierre Harmel, Belgian lawyer, politician, and diplomat

It may also refer to Peganum harmala.

See also
Counts of Harmel